A Class by Himself is a British sitcom that aired from 1971 to 1972. The half-hour series was made by HTV and starred John Le Mesurier of Dad's Army fame as Lord Bleasham.

Cast
John Le Mesurier - Lord Bleasham
Seretta Wilson - Joanna Bleasham
Richard Stilgoe - Barneby Locke
Peter Butterworth - Clutton

Episodes

Pilot (1971)
The Thumbe of Barneby Locke (14 January 1971)

Series 1 (1972)
A Rolls Is a Rolls Is a Rolls (13 September 1972)
The Bleasham Memoirs (20 September 1972)
Restoration Comedy (27 September 1972)
Guess Who's Coming to Lunch (4 October 1972)
The Servant Problem (11 October 1972)
The Bath Chap (18 October 1972)

Archive Status

As of January 2023, the pilot and five out of six episodes are missing with no known copies surviving. Only the first episode, A Rolls Is a Rolls Is a Rolls  remains in the archives.

References

External links

ITV sitcoms
1970s British sitcoms
1971 British television series debuts
1972 British television series endings